b1a may refer to:

 Rockwell B-1A Lancer, U.S. USAF bomber aircraft
 GSR Class B1a, a steam locomotive class
 B1A section, a WWII counterespionage unit in the Double-Cross System (XX System)
 B1a cells, a type of B1 cell
 B1A postal code, see List of postal codes of Canada: B

See also

 BA1 (disambiguation)
 BA (disambiguation)